OMM may refer to:
 O'Melveny & Myers, a US law firm with a worldwide practice
 Object memory model, a structure model for digital object memories
 The Observer Music Monthly, the British monthly music magazine found in The Observer newspaper
 Obstacle mobility model, a type of mobility model
 Of Mice and Men, a novella written by Nobel Prize-winning author John Steinbeck
 Of Mice & Men (band), (often abbreviated OM&M) an American metalcore band
 Of Monsters and Men, an Icelandic indie band
 Old Man Murray, a gaming website
 OMM, a godlike character with a visual representation resembling Jesus in the film THX 1138
 One Magnificent Morning, an American programming block that airs Saturday mornings on the owned-and-operated stations and affiliates of The CW
 The One Million Masterpiece, the world's largest collaborative art project
 The Original Mountain Marathon, a multi-day running event and a precursor to adventure racing
 One Million Moms, a U.S. conservative group
 Open music model, a business model for the digital distribution of music
 The QualiPSo OpenSource Maturity Model
 Order of Military Merit (Canada), a Canadian military honour (post-nominal letters)
 Organisation météorologique mondiale, French for World Meteorological Organization
 Organização da Mulher Moçambicana, Portuguese for Organization of Mozambican Women
 Osteopathic manipulative medicine, a core technique of osteopathy and osteopathic medicine in the United States
 Outer mitochondrial membrane

See also 
 Om, a mantra and mystical Sanskrit sound of Hindu origin